Frisilia is a genus of moths in the family Lecithoceridae. The genus was erected by Francis Walker in 1864.

Species
anningensis species group
Frisilia anningensis C. S. Wu, 1997
Frisilia chinensis Gozmány, 1978
Frisilia compsostoma Meyrick, 1921
Frisilia cornualis Park & C. S. Wu, 2008
Frisilia homalistis Meyrick, 1935
Frisilia melanardis Meyrick, 1910
Frisilia neacantha Wu & Park, 1999
Frisilia procentra Meyrick, 1916
Frisilia senilis Meyrick, 1910
Frisilia spuriella Park, 2005
Frisilia strepsiptila Meyrick, 1910
Frisilia sulcata Meyrick, 1910
Frisilia thapsina Wu & Park, 1999
Frisilia verticosa Meyrick, 1914
nesciatella species group
Frisilia ancylosana Wu & Park, 1999
Frisilia asiana Park, 2005
Frisilia ceylonica Park, 2001
Frisilia dipsia Meyrick, 1910
Frisilia forficatella Park, 2005
Frisilia heliapta (Meyrick, 1887)
Frisilia moriutii Park, 2005
Frisilia nesciatella Walker, 1864
Frisilia nesiotes Park & C. S. Wu, 2008
Frisilia notifica Meyrick, 1910
Frisilia rostrata (Meyrick, 1906)
Frisilia sejuncta Meyrick, 1929
Frisilia tricrosura Wu & Park, 1999
Frisilia triturata Meyrick, 1914
Frisilia trizeugma Wu & Park, 1999
Species group incertae sedis
Frisilia crossophaea (Meyrick, 1931)
Frisilia drimyla Diakonoff, [1968]
Frisilia homochlora Meyrick, 1910
Frisilia serrata Wu & Park, 1999

References

 
Lecithocerinae
Moth genera